En ven i bolignøden is a Danish 1965 film directed by Annelise Reenberg and with a script by Peer Guldbrandsen.

Cast 
Birgit Sadolin
Ebbe Langberg
Morten Grunwald
Ove Sprogøe

Karen Lykkehus
Jeanne Darville
Sigrid Horne-Rasmussen
Gabriel Axel
Bjørn Puggaard-Müller
Karl Stegger
Hans W. Petersen
Bjørn Spiro
Ole Monty
Miskow Makwarth

Henry Nielsen
Ebba Amfeldt
Gunnar Lemvigh
Knud Rex
Valsø Holm
Agnes Rehni
Knud Hallest
Bertel Lauring
Gerda Madsen
Hugo Herrestrup
Jørgen Weel
Freddy Koch
Poul Müller

References

External links 
 
 

1965 films
Danish comedy films
1960s Danish-language films
Films directed by Annelise Reenberg
Films scored by Sven Gyldmark